Christine Ombaka Oduor is a Kenyan politician from the Orange Democratic Movement.

Education 
Ombaka has graduated from the following institutions:

 Isles International University
 Lancaster University
 University of Nairobi

Political career 
Ombaka was elected women's representative in the National Assembly from Siaya County in the 2017 general election. She was re-elected in the 2022 general election.

References 

Place of birth missing (living people)
Year of birth missing (living people)
Living people
Kenyan women representatives
People from Siaya County
Alumni of Lancaster University
University of Nairobi alumni
21st-century Kenyan women politicians
21st-century Kenyan politicians
Members of the 12th Parliament of Kenya
Members of the 13th Parliament of Kenya
Orange Democratic Movement politicians